A Collision or (3+4=7) is the third full-length studio album and sixth album overall by David Crowder Band and the third recorded for sixstepsrecords, released in September 2005. "Foreverandever Etc…" is on the Digital Praise PC game Guitar Praise.

Critical reception

A Collision garnered critical acclaim from music critics. At CCM Magazine, David McCreary graded the album an A−, feeling that "With A Collision, the six-piece modern worship outfit unfurls its most diverse and sonically compelling album to date—an 18-track set clocking in at a satisfying 73 minutes and change." Tony Cummings the founder of Cross Rhythms gave it a perfect ten squares calling it "truly a groundbreaking album", also stating it's a "classic which will be enjoyed and wondered at for decades to come." At Christianity Today, Russ Breimeier gave it a perfect five stars proclaiming that the release is "unquestionably ambitious and inspired, unlike any modern worship album to this point" on which is "nonetheless an expression of worship—one so catchy and creative, fans will clamor to David Crowder Band concerts to sing praises to God at the top of their lungs." Jared Johnson of Allmusic gave it four-and-a-half stars noting how "A Collision's stronghold on the CCM charts continued for well over a year, racking up every accolade imaginable."

At Christian Broadcasting Network, Jennifer E. Jones gave it four spins writing that it is "Too hard to pick album highlights" on the release because "It's an experience piece that should be listened to in its entirety with headphones on and hands lifted high." David Taylor of Jesus Freak Hideout gave it a perfect five stars highlighting that "Part of the beauty of this release is David Crowder Band's ability to seamlessly blend in more traditional modern worship songs with newer techniques, creating a solid yet original worship album from start to finish." Paul Whitfield of Soul Shine Magazine gave it four stars writing that "With their lyrically inspiring songs, outstanding music, and spiritual depth this masterpiece fits together nicely on Crowder's musical canvas." At Patrol Magazine, David Session gave it a seven point eight out of ten finding that "the artistic shock therapy that _A Collision_ performs on worship music as a whole cannot be praised highly enough." Joe Montague of The Phantom Tollbooth in an unrated review stating that "A Collision provides further proof that the often enigmatic Crowder deserves to be mentioned in the same breath as the top artists of our day."

Track listing 
Source: Official David Crowder site

Personnel 
 David Crowder – lead vocals, acoustic guitar, piano
 Jack Parker – electric guitar, banjo, backing vocals
 Jason Soley – electric guitar, backing vocals
 Mike Dodson – bass, programming
 Mike Hogan – violin, turntables
 B-Wack – drums, percussion, programming

Chart positions

Singles

Awards 
In 2006, the album won a Dove Award for Rock/Contemporary Album of the Year at the 37th GMA Dove Awards. The song "Here Is Our King" also won Rock/Contemporary Recorded Song of the Year.

References 

2005 albums
David Crowder Band albums